The Sudbury II was a salvage and rescue tug that served during World War II with the Royal Australian Navy as Caledionian Salvor, however was never commissioned. She was sold in 1958 to Island Tug & Barge Ltd, Vancouver, renamed Sudbury II, and registered as a Fijian vessel. Sudbury II undertook numerous salvage jobs in the Pacific Ocean. She was sold in 1981 and became a fishing vessel and renamed Lady Pacific.

Fate
She caught fire and sank off Prince Rupert on 31 October 1982.

Citations

References

Further reading
Norris, Pat Wastell; High Seas, High Risk: The Story of the Sudburys. 

1942 ships
Ships built in Napa, California
Caledonian Savior
Tugboats of Canada